Unorganized Rainy River District is an unorganized area in the Rainy River District of Ontario, Canada, comprising all communities in the district which are not part of incorporated municipalities. Quetico Provincial Park is located entirely within this area.

The area has gradually been reduced in size as portions of it were annexed by surrounding incorporated townships. In 2004, the Township of Morley annexed the geographic townships of Sifton and Dewart, thereby splitting Unorganized Rainy River into two non-contiguous areas.

The Township of Atikokan, as well as the Indian reserves of Rainy Lake 17A, 17B, 26A, Seine River 23A, and 23B, are enclaves within the unorganized area.

Communities include Arbor Vitae, Burditt Lake, Calm Lake, Flanders, Crilly, Gameland, Glenorchy, Government Landing, Kawene, Mine Centre, Off Lake Corner, Rocky Inlet and Sapawe.

Demographics

Population trend:
 Population in 2011: 1159
 Population in 2006: 1431
 Population in 2001: 1605 (or 1526 when adjusted to 2006 boundaries)
 Population in 1996: 1580 (or 1614 when adjusted to 2001 boundaries)
 Land area: 
 Population in 1991: 1495

See also
List of townships in Ontario

References

Communities in Rainy River District
Rainy River